Gerald Edgar Grimstone, Baron Grimstone of Boscobel (born 27 August 1949) is a British businessman. He was previously chairman of Barclays Bank plc and of Standard Life and group deputy chairman of Barclays plc, the holding company for the Barclays Group.

On 18 March 2020, he became an unpaid minister at the Department for International Trade and the Department for Business, Energy and Industrial Strategy, and it was announced he would become a life peer.

Early life
Gerald Edgar Grimstone was born in August 1949, in Streatham, London, the son of a carpet fitter father. Grimstone has described his father as a "working class intellectual" and a senior member of the UK Communist Party.

He was educated at the Whitgift School, Croydon, and Merton College, Oxford, where he received a degree in chemistry.

Career
Grimstone worked as a civil servant from 1972 to 1986, and then as a director of Schroders from 1986 to 1999.

Grimstone was chairman of Standard Life (now Standard Life Aberdeen) from 2007 till 2019, deputy chairman of Barclays since January 2016, a non-executive director of Deloitte and the lead non-executive director at the Ministry of Defence.

Honours
Grimstone was knighted in the 2014 Birthday Honours, and received that accolade from the Prince of Wales on 6 February 2015. On 8 April 2020 he was created Baron Grimstone of Boscobel, of Belgravia in the City of Westminster.

Personal life
In 1973, Grimstone married Hon. Janet Elizabeth Gudrun Suenson-Taylor, daughter of the 2nd Baron Grantchester; they had a son and two daughters before divorcing in 1995.

References

1949 births
Living people
British businesspeople
Conservative Party (UK) life peers
Barclays people
Deloitte people
People educated at Whitgift School
Alumni of Merton College, Oxford
Fellows of Merton College, Oxford
Life peers created by Elizabeth II